For the Summer Olympics, there were two venues listed that started with 1–9 while there were 31 venues that started with the letter A.

1–9

A

References

 List 1-9 To A